Simone Sannibale (born 10 March 1986 in Albano Laziale) is an Italian  footballer who plays as a defender for A.S.G. Nocerina on loan from S.S. Lazio.

He made his debut for the biancocelesti in the 2004 Italian Super Cup, played against A.C. Milan and ended in a 0–3 loss for Lazio, replacing Fernando Couto. In the following years, he was then sent out on loan to a number of Serie C1 and Serie C2 teams, most recently Scafatese in January 2008.

References

External links
 Player profile at campionatoprimavera.com

1986 births
Living people
People from Albano Laziale
Serie C players
S.S. Lazio players
U.S. Salernitana 1919 players
A.S.G. Nocerina players
Association football defenders
Italy youth international footballers
Italian footballers
Footballers from Lazio
Sportspeople from the Metropolitan City of Rome Capital